Wehmer is a surname. Notable people with the name include:

Carl Wehmer (1858–1935), German chemist and mycologist
Friedrich Wehmer (1885–1964), German politician 
Justus Wehmer (ca.1690–1750), German architect

See also
Wehmer House, is a historic building located in Guttenberg, Iowa, United States